Billy Bates (1855–1900) was an English all-round cricketer.

Billy Bates may also refer to:

Billy Ray Bates (born 1956), American basketball player
Billy Bates (baseball) (born 1963),  American baseball player
Billy Bates (footballer) (1922–1997), English footballer

See also
William Bates (disambiguation)